Åsa-Britt Karlsson  (born 6 July 1957) is a Swedish politician. She is a member of the Centre Party.

References

Centre Party (Sweden) politicians
1957 births
Living people
Place of birth missing (living people)
Örebro University alumni